ash-Sheikh Sa'd is a Palestinian village in the Jerusalem Governorate, located 6 kilometers Southeast of Jerusalem in the central West Bank. According to the Palestinian Central Bureau of Statistics, the village had a population of 2,406 in 2006.

The village's residents have family in Jabel Mukaber, an Arab neighborhood in East Jerusalem, and attend school there. Sheikh Sa'd's cemetery is located in the neighborhood as well. Since the Second Intifada in 2000, Sheikh Sa'd residents have not been allowed to enter Jabel Mukaber without a permit.

Footnotes

Bibliography

External links
 Welcome to al-Shaykh Sa'ad
Ash-Sheikh Sa’d, Welcome to Palestine
Survey of Western Palestine, Map 17:    IAA, Wikimedia commons
 Ash Sheikh Sa'd  village (fact sheet), Applied Research Institute–Jerusalem, ARIJ
 Ash Sheikh Sa'd  village profile, ARIJ
Ash Sheikh Sa'd  aerial photo, ARIJ
 Locality Development Priorities and Needs in Ash Sheikh Sa'd, ARIJ 

Villages in the West Bank
Jerusalem Governorate
Municipalities of the State of Palestine